"There's No Place Like London" is a song co-written by Lynsey de Paul and Gerard Kenny, and held by the British Library that was published by Lynsey de Paul Music/Chelsea Publishing Co Ltd/Arlon Music/Chappell Music. It was first recorded by Shirley Bassey backed with a 54 piece orchestra, produced by de Paul and released as a single in 1986. It was her last single for the independent British record label Towerbell Records and, unusually, the song starts with the chorus rather than a verse. As well as a stand-alone single in its own right, the song was recorded to promote the London Tourist Board. A promotional video was made that featured Bassey's daughter Sharon and grandson Luke as well as de Paul and cameo's from celebrities such as Michael Caine, Spike Milligan, David Frost and Frank Bruno. It was premiered at the Royal Albert Hall, with songwriter de Paul in the audience as part of Bassey's 30th anniversary concerts. The song was well received by the U.K. press. Bassey performed "There's No Place Like London" in 1986 as part of her “Live from the Piccadilly” show as well as on the 1987 Royal Variety Performance, and ironically for her "Shirley Bassey Live" in Berlin in honour of 750 years of Berlin in 1987. She also performed the song on prime time TV on "Des O'Connor Tonight" Christmas show. The song is considered as one of Bassey's defining, signature songs and is listed as part of her essential repertoire alongside other Bassey classics.

It was released for the first time on CD to tie-in with the UK held Olympic Games in 2012 on the Warner/Chappell album, Olympic Tracks. It is listed in the BBC music database which catalogues songs they play. Speaking about the recording of the song in an interview, de Paul said "we wrote.."There's No Place Like London", and the Tourist Board liked it, and then we thought of an artist and I thought of Shirley Bassey. So I approached her and asked her to sing it and she really liked the song - that's the way round it came, it didn't come that I wrote for her I just had the song and said would you sing it. And she was great." It is still one of the most played Bassey songs on BBC radio and is listed on their Bassey website. Two different live Bassey performances of the song appear on the Odeon Entertainment DVD, Shirley Bassey On TV, released in 2010.

De Paul recorded a version of the song with a whole host of celebrity friends to celebrate Capital Radio's twentieth anniversary in 1993 under the name 'Lynsey and friends', which was produced by de Paul and released as a single in the UK. It was the winning record for the LBC London Parade, and went on sale to raise money for the Variety Club of Great Britain. According to the CD sleeve, the friends included Frankie Vaughan, Patti Boulaye, Gareth Hunt, Kenny Lynch, Rula Lenska, Gwen Taylor, Lionel Blair, Lorraine Chase, Pam St. Clement, Harry Fowler, Polly James, Larry Adler, Rose Marie, Victor Spinetti, Gorden Kaye and the St Joan of Arc School Choir.

It was covered and released by drag queen diva La Voix (real name Chris Dennis), star and semi-finalist of Britain's Got Talent and Absolutely Fabulous: The Movie, as a track on the 2018 album, Hello. Drag Queen Tiffaney Wells also has covered the song.

"There's No Place Like London" has also been recorded as an instrumental version by the UK band leader and producer Tony Evans as The Tony Evans Orchestra on his album of the same name, as well as by the artist Ameritz. Being in the style of a slow fox-trot, it has become a ballroom dancing standard. The song was also performed by "Hills Angels" as part of a musical sketch in episode No. 2 of the 18th season of the Benny Hill Show in 1988 and released internationally on DVD in 2011.

The lyrics sing the praises of London, England, the birthplace of de Paul as well as the adopted home of Gerard Kenny, and featured the lyrics "Take Paris in the spring, take New York in the fall, but I'd leave them behind, for the best of them all". In 2012, Gerard Kenny was interviewed by Radio Warwickshire about writing this and other songs. In the interview he revealed how he and de Paul wrote the song and how proud he was to hear Bassey sing it at the Royal Variety Performance in front of Queen Elizabeth II, who clearly liked it and was part of the spontaneous standing ovation that Bassey received.

A show entitled No Place Like London after the song "There's No Place Like London", featuring singers Brunie Riley and Milko Foucault-Larche singing the songs of Shirley Bassey and Engelbert Humperdinck, is currently on tour with dates in Australia. The song is mentioned an article entitled "Iconic Landscapes: The Lyrical Links of Songs and Cities", that appeared in the academic publication Focus on Geography, a peer-reviewed, full-colour quarterly journal, with numerous articles written by well-known academic and professional geographers. In 2021, the song was included in the listing "Notable Songs with City Names in the Title" by journalist Ansel Pereira. It still receives plays on major radio stations such as BBC Radio.

References

1986 songs
1986 singles
Shirley Bassey songs
Lynsey de Paul songs
Songs written by Lynsey de Paul
Songs written by Gerard Kenny
Songs about London